Popular Unity Party may refer to:

 Popular Unity (Greece)
 People's Unity Party – Socialist Party, Iceland
 Popular Unity Party (Iraq)
 Popular Unity Party (Portugal)
 Popular Unity Party (Tunisia)

See also
 Popular Unity (disambiguation)